Roses for Anne Teresa / Football Stories is a joint theatre production of East West Theatre Company from Sarajevo and Bosnian National Theatre Zenica. The show is dedicated to Anne Teresa De Keersmaeker, a choreographer and her masterpiece Rosas danst Rosas. The show, directed by Haris Pašović and choreographed by Edward Clug, premiered 23 September 2011 in Zenica's Bosnian National Theatre. After that it toured eleven Bosnia and Herzegovina towns. Those towns have included Prijedor, Bihać, Jajce, Gradiska, Sarajevo, Sokolac, Rudo, Tešanj and Srebrenik. 

The show deals with a theme of masculinity in a small Balkan town and examines the question of identity of a 21st-century man. It won a “Special Award for Best Choreography” at the International Theatre Festival MESS Sarajevo 2011.

Original cast

References

Theatre in Bosnia and Herzegovina
Culture in Sarajevo